Swap meet is a type of flea market.

Swap meet may also refer to:
"Swap Meet" (CSI), an episode of the television program CSI
Swap Meet (film), an American film
"Swap Meet" (song), a song by Nirvana
Swap Meet (The Price Is Right), a segment game on the game show The Price Is Right